Fredi Bobic (born 30 October 1971) is a German football executive and former player who played as a striker. He was most recently the sporting director of Bundesliga club Hertha BSC.

Club career
Bobic was born in Maribor, SFR Yugoslavia, to a Slovene father and a Croatian mother. A few months after his birth, his parents emigrated with him to Germany and settled down first in Ditzingen, then in Stuttgart. There, he started playing football at VfR Bad Cannstatt but soon switched to the youth team of VfB Stuttgart. While in Stuttgart, he also acquired German citizenship. 

Bobic reached his prime in the mid-1990s at VfB Stuttgart in the Bundesliga. In his first Bundesliga season (1994–95), he scored a goal in each of his first five games, so he became a candidate for the Germany national team after only a few appearances in the first German league. In 1996, he was the Bundesliga's top scorer with 17 goals. At Stuttgart, he formed part of a successful attacking line-up, along with strike partner Giovane Élber and attacking midfielder Krasimir Balakov, known as the "magic triangle". 

After four years in Stuttgart, in 1999 he signed with Borussia Dortmund and was the club's top scorer in both 1999–2000 and 2000–01. However, after the signings of Jan Koller and Márcio Amoroso in the summer of 2001, he soon fell out of favor and played only three games in the first half of 2001–02 season. 

Subsequently, Bobic was loaned to the Premier League side Bolton Wanderers, where he had a successful spell, playing a key role in keeping Bolton in the Premiership. His hat-trick in the 4–1 win against Ipswich at the Reebok Stadium ensured Bolton stayed up, and remained the last Bolton hat-trick in a competitive game until Joe Mason in the 2014–15 season. He scored once more for Bolton, in a 3–2 victory over Aston Villa. 

After returning from England, Bobic was signed by newly promoted Bundesliga side Hannover 96 where he reestablished himself as one of the league's top scorers, netting 14 times in 27 games. 

In 2003, he was signed by Hertha BSC, where he played for two seasons, scoring 8 goals in 54 games. 

He last played for Croatian outfit NK Rijeka before retiring in June 2006, at the end of the 2005–06 season.

International career
Bobic won 37 caps (10 goals) for the Germany national team and was part of the UEFA Euro 1996 winning squad. He also played at UEFA Euro 2004, having returned to the national team in 2002 after a four-year absence.

Managerial career

Bobic signed a contract as a managing director of Bulgarian club Chernomorets Burgas on 25 March 2009 and worked in the club with his former teammate Krasimir Balakov.

On 27 July 2010, Bobic became new director of sport of VfB Stuttgart. On 20 January 2012, he extended his contract with VfB Stuttgart until June 2016. He took on the role as board representative for sport of the club on 10 April 2013. Bobic was sacked on 24 September 2014. 

On 1 June 2016, Bobic became sporting director of Eintracht Frankfurt. During his term the club won the DFB-Pokal after beating Bayern Munich in the final (3–1).

On 14 April 2021, Hertha BSC announced its decision to hire Bobic as their new managing director for sport starting 1 July 2021. Bobic was sacked on 28 January 2023 after a 2–0 loss to 1. FC Union in the Berlin derby.

Career statistics

Club

International
Scores and results list Germany's goal tally first, score column indicates score after each Bobic goal.

Honours
VfB Stuttgart
 DFB-Pokal: 1996–97
 UEFA Cup Winners' Cup: runner-up: 1997–98

Borussia Dortmund
 Bundesliga: 2001–02

NK Rijeka
 Croatian Cup: 2005–06

Germany
 UEFA European Championship: 1996

Individual
 Bundesliga top scorer: 1995–96
 kicker Bundesliga Team of the Season: 1995–96

References

External links

 
 
 

1971 births
Living people
Naturalized citizens of Germany
Yugoslav emigrants to Germany
Slovenian emigrants to Germany
German people of Slovenian descent
German people of Croatian descent
Slovenian people of Croatian descent
Sportspeople from Maribor
German footballers
Association football forwards
Germany international footballers
UEFA European Championship-winning players
Kicker-Torjägerkanone Award winners
UEFA Euro 1996 players
UEFA Euro 2004 players
Bundesliga players
2. Bundesliga players
Premier League players
Croatian Football League players
Stuttgarter Kickers players
VfB Stuttgart players
TSF Ditzingen players
Borussia Dortmund players
Bolton Wanderers F.C. players
Hannover 96 players
Hertha BSC players
HNK Rijeka players
German expatriate footballers
German expatriate sportspeople in England
Expatriate footballers in England
German expatriate sportspeople in Croatia
Expatriate footballers in Croatia
West German footballers
Footballers from Stuttgart
German expatriate sportspeople in Bulgaria
VfB Stuttgart non-playing staff
Hertha BSC non-playing staff
Eintracht Frankfurt non-playing staff